Doctor of Architecture (D Arch) is a title accorded to students who have completed a degree program accredited by the National Architectural Accrediting Board. The only university currently offering a Doctor of Architecture degree is the University of Hawaii at Manoa.

Background
Most state registration boards in the United States require a degree from an accredited professional degree program as a prerequisite for licensure. The National Architectural Accrediting Board, the sole agency authorized to accredit U.S. professional degree programs in architecture, recognizes three types of degrees: the Bachelor of Architecture, the Master of Architecture, and the Doctor of Architecture. Doctor of Architecture and Master of Architecture degree programs may consist of a pre-professional undergraduate degree and a professional graduate degree that, when earned sequentially, constitute an accredited professional education. However, the pre-professional degree is not, by itself, recognized as an accredited degree.

The only university in the United States offering a Doctor of Architecture degree is the University of Hawaii at Manoa. The Doctorate of Architecture was first accredited by the NAAB in 1999. Admission to the University of Hawaii program is open to students who have completed high school, transfer students who have completed some college-level work, and students who have completed Baccalaureate or advanced degrees. Completion of the degree requires 120 undergraduate credits and 90 graduate credits.

References

Architecture
Architectural education